The West Indian cricket team in Kenya in 2001 played 3 One Day International games and won all of them. It was the first full tour to Kenya by a Test playing country. Collins and David Obuya made their ODI debuts.

Schedule

Squads

 Otieno withdrew and was replaced by D.Obuya

One Day Internationals (ODIs)

1st ODI

2nd ODI

3rd ODI

External links
 Cricinfo Tournament Page

2001 in Kenyan cricket
2001 in West Indian cricket
International cricket competitions in 2001
2001
Kenyan cricket seasons from 2000–01
Sport in Nairobi